The Hull Daily Mail is an English regional daily newspaper for Kingston upon Hull, in the East Riding of Yorkshire. The Hull Daily Mail has been circulated in various guises since 1885. A second edition, the East Riding Mail, covers East Yorkshire outside the city of Hull.

The paper is published by Mail News & Media. Mail News & Media also publishes two free weekly newspapers, the Hull Advertiser and Beverley Advertiser, and a monthly magazine, The Journal. In 2012, Local World acquired owner Northcliffe Media from Daily Mail and General Trust. Trinity Mirror purchased Local World in 2015, and is now known as Reach plc.

The Hull Daily Mail is produced every day except for Sunday and has a readership of  10,232.

History
The paper's prehistory is indicated in the heading of the first issue on Tuesday, 29 September 1885 which reads Hull Daily Mail and East Yorkshire and Lincolnshire Courier (with which is incorporated The Hull and Lincolnshire Times). The paper had 4 pages and cost one halfpenny and was published daily.

Its political stance was declared as both defensive and aggressive Conservatism, though with regard to local affairs it would not be influenced by its national convictions. It would rely entirely on its own reporters and not use 'stereo'. For national news, it would draw on the best telegraphic communications. It aimed to be a profitable commercial venture, believing that profit would also ensure quality.

From 8 March 1886, the paper was published as The Hull Daily Mail And Hull Packet. The Hull Packet had nearly a century of history behind it, having run from  1787 to 26 February 1886 closing with issue number 5,288.

The on-line archived Hull Daily Mail is a valuable record of the social history of the city from 1885 to 1950 and sets its story in the context of national and international events. Alongside major developments will be found the stories of minor achievements and minor crimes, of small clubs, pubs, theatres and cinemas, businesses, churches, schools and neighbourhood groups and within them 'snapshots' of individuals with no claim to fame other than that they were there.

In 2015, the Hull Daily Mail received a new logo and general design to both the newspaper and website, replacing logos and styling that had been used since the mid-2000s, and introducing weekend supplements and a TV and entertainment guide named 'The View'.

As part of a Trinity Mirror restructure, Neil Hodgkinson, editor of the Hull Daily Mail, was promoted to editor-in-chief in February 2016 for Humber and Lincolnshire regions, overseeing the Grimsby Telegraph, Scunthorpe Telegraph and Lincolnshire Echo as well as the Mail. In March 2018 the Reach PLC titles for the North East, including the Chronicle, Journal and Teesside Gazette, were added to his portfolio of titles.

The Hull Daily Mail changed its banner head on its website to 'Hull Live' after the company was taken over by Trinity Mirror in 2017. Trinity Mirror was re-branded Reach plc in May 2018.

Awards
The newspaper has won the award for Yorkshire Daily Newspaper of the Year five times, in 2003,
2004, 2006, 2007, and 2012.

Supplements
Monday – Extra Time (sport), The Match (Hull City A.F.C. reports)
Tuesday – Femail
Wednesday – The Business, HotShots (junior sport)
Thursday – Property Guide
Friday – Motor Mail
Saturday – The Guide (entertainment magazine, includes TV listings)

For many years, a separate Sports Mail supplement was published Saturdays. Printed on distinctive green newsprint, it was available an hour after the end of the afternoon matches of the city's football and Rugby League teams, and newsagents would stay open specifically to sell and distribute it.

References

External links
Hull Daily Mail official site

Mass media in Kingston upon Hull
Newspapers published in Yorkshire
Northcliffe Media
Publications established in 1885
1885 establishments in England
Daily newspapers published in the United Kingdom
Newspapers published by Reach plc